The 2004 season of the Tuvalu A-Division was the fourth season of association football competition. The title was won by Lakena United, their first title and the first time the league was won by a team other than FC Niutao.

References

Tuvalu A-Division seasons
Tuvalu
football